His Sweetheart is a 1917 American drama silent film directed by Donald Crisp and written by George Beban, John B. Clymer and Lawrence McCloskey. The film stars George Beban, Helen Jerome Eddy, Sarah Kernan, Harry De Vere, Cecil Holland and Kathleen Kirkham. The film was released on January 29, 1917, by Paramount Pictures.

Plot

Cast 
George Beban as Joe
Helen Jerome Eddy as Trina Capino
Sarah Kernan as Joe's mother, Mama Mia
Harry De Vere as Godfrey Kelland
Cecil Holland
Kathleen Kirkham as Mrs. Kelland
Peaches Jackson
J.N. Leonard
Robert E. Rolson 
Charles Yorba

Preservation status
This film survives and held in the Library of Congress, Packard Campus for Audio-Visual Conservation collection.

References

External links 
 
 

1917 films
1910s English-language films
Silent American drama films
1917 drama films
Paramount Pictures films
Films directed by Donald Crisp
American black-and-white films
American silent feature films
1910s American films